Euderces boucardi is a species of beetle in the family Cerambycidae. It was described by Louis Alexandre Auguste Chevrolat in 1862 and is known from Central and North America, specifically from Costa Rica, Nicaragua, Honduras, Guatemala, and southern Mexico (Chiapas).

References

Euderces
Beetles of Central America
Beetles of North America
Beetles described in 1862
Taxa named by Louis Alexandre Auguste Chevrolat